The Toano Range is a mountain range located in eastern Elko County, Nevada in the United States.  The highest point in the range reaches . The range is separated from the Goshute Mountains to the south by Morgan Pass.

Interstate 80 and Union Pacific Railroad's Central Corridor(former Feather River Route), used both by freight trains and Amtrak's California Zephyr, cross the Toano range via Silver Zone Pass. On the eastern approach to the pass the railroad makes a near 360 degree hairpin bend called the Arnold Loop.

Toano is a name derived from the Shoshoni language meaning "pipe camp".

Notes 

Mountain ranges of Nevada
Mountain ranges of Elko County, Nevada